Mujica (in Basque Muxika) is a Basque surname. Variations include Mujíca, Mújica, Mújico, Mujika, Mugica, Múgica, Mugika, Moxica and Mojica.

Mujica may refer to:

People
 Aylín Mújica (born 1974), Cuban actress and model
 Edward Mujica (born 1984), a right-handed pitcher for Major League Baseball
 José Mujica (born 1935), a Uruguayan statesman and former president, known as Pepe
 Manuel Mujica Lainez (1910–1984), Argentine fiction writer and art critic
 Pedro Mujica Carassa, early 20th century Peruvian politician
 José Mojica (1896–1974), Mexican Franciscan friar, tenor and film actor
 José Mojica Marins, a.k.a. "Coffin Joe" (born 1936), Brazilian filmmaker, actor and screenwriter
 Adrián de Moxica (1453–1499), Spanish nobleman and explorer of Basque decent
 Carlos Mugica (1930–1974), Argentine Roman Catholic priest and activist
 Francisco Múgica (born 1907), Argentine film director, film editor and cinematographer
 René Mugica (1909–1998), Argentine actor, film director and screenwriter
 Aritz Mújika (born 1981), Spanish footballer
 Jokin Mújika (born 1962), Basque cyclist

Other uses
 Francisco Mujica International Airport, Morelia, Michoacán, Mexico

See also
 Mugica, a brand of Llama-Gabilondo y Cia SA firearms
 Muxika, a town and municipality in Biscay, Spain

Basque-language surnames